Francisco Manuel Hervás Tirada  (born 7 March 1962, in Sevilla) is a Spanish volleyball player who represented his native country with the men's national team at the Summer Olympics in 1992.

In August 2018, he was appointed coach of the Peru women's national volleyball team

References
  

1962 births
Living people
Olympic volleyball players of Spain
Spanish men's volleyball players
Volleyball coaches
Volleyball players at the 1992 Summer Olympics
Sportspeople from Seville